Metis, in ancient Greek religion and mythology, was a Oceanid nymph, one of the daughters of the Titans Oceanus and Tethys. 
Metis is notable for helping a young Zeus free his siblings from his father Cronus' belly by supplying him with a special drug. After Zeus became king, he and Metis were married, and she bore him a daughter, Athena, the goddess of wisdom. After hearing a prophecy stating that after Metis gave birth to Athena, she would have a son mightier than Zeus who would overthrow him, Zeus tricked the still pregnant Metis and swallowed her whole.

Function 
By the era of Greek philosophy in the 5th century BC, Metis had become the first deity of wisdom and deep thought, but her name originally connoted "magical cunning" and was as easily equated with the trickster powers of Prometheus as with the "royal metis" of Zeus. The Stoic commentators allegorised Metis as the embodiment of "prudence", "wisdom" or "wise counsel", in which form she was inherited by the Renaissance.

The Greek word metis meant a quality that combined wisdom and cunning. This quality was considered to be highly admirable, the hero Odysseus being the embodiment of it, using with Polyphemus, son of Poseidon. In the Classical era, metis was regarded by Athenians as one of the notable characteristics of the Athenian character.

Mythology

Hesiod's account 
Metis was an Oceanid, one of the daughters of Oceanus and his sister-wife Tethys, who were 3000 in number. She was a sister of the Potamoi (river-gods), sons of Oceanus and Tethys, who also numbered 3000. Metis was the one who gave Zeus a potion to cause Cronus to vomit out his siblings. She became Zeus' first great spouse, Zeus himself is titled Metieta, in the Homeric poems.

Metis was both a threat to Zeus and an indispensable aid. He lay with her, but immediately feared the consequences. It had been prophesied that she would bear extremely powerful children: the first, a daughter who would be wiser than her mother, and the second, a son more powerful than his father, who would eventually overthrow Zeus and become king of the cosmos in his place. In order to forestall these dire consequences, he tricked her into turning herself into a fly and promptly swallowed her. He was too late however, for she was already pregnant with  their first and only child, Athena. Metis crafted armor, a spear, and a shield for her daughter, and raised her in Zeus' mind. Athena began to use the spear and shield her mother had made, banging them together to give her father a headache. Soon, he couldn't take his headache anymore and had Hephaestus cut his head open to let out whatever was in there. Athena emerged from Zeus's mind in full glory, wearing the armor her mother made her. Athena was made the goddess of wisdom, warfare, and crafts.

Other versions 
According to a scholiast on the Theogony, Metis had the ability of changing her shape at will.

According to Pseudo-Apollodorus, Metis was raped by Zeus, and changed many forms in order to escape him, after he pursued her.

An alternative version of the same myth makes the Cyclops Brontes rather than Zeus the father of Athena before Metis is swallowed.

Hesiod's account is followed by Acusilaus and the Orphic tradition, which enthroned Metis side by side with Eros as primal cosmogenic forces. Plato makes Poros, or "creative ingenuity", a son of Metis.

Ancient legacy 
The similarities between Zeus swallowing Metis and Cronus swallowing his children have been noted by several scholars. This also caused some controversy in regard to reproduction myths.

Modern legacy 
 Metis Island in Antarctica is named after Metis.
 9 Metis, one of the larger main-belt asteroids, is named after this goddess.
 Metis, a moon of Jupiter, is named after the goddess.
 Metis is a SembraMedia program that trains tech-savvy young women to become digital leaders and grow their own startups; it is funded by the Google News Initiative

In sociology 
In his 1998 book Seeing Like a State, James C. Scott used “metis” to describe the knowhow, experience and wisdom that people acquire in building expertise, as a key contributor to success in society that is not accounted for by the high modernist approach to central administration.

See also 
 Themis
 Dzunukwa
 Epiphron

Footnotes

Notes

References 
 Apollodorus, The Library with an English Translation by Sir James George Frazer, F.B.A., F.R.S. in 2 Volumes, Cambridge, MA, Harvard University Press; London, William Heinemann Ltd. 1921. ISBN 0-674-99135-4. Online version at the Perseus Digital Library. Greek text available from the same website.
 Caldwell, Richard, Hesiod's Theogony, Focus Publishing/R. Pullins Company (June 1, 1987). .
 Gantz, Timothy, Early Greek Myth: A Guide to Literary and Artistic Sources, Johns Hopkins University Press, 1996, Two volumes:  (Vol. 1),  (Vol. 2).
 Grimal, Pierre, The Dictionary of Classical Mythology, Wiley-Blackwell, 1996. .
 Hard, Robin, The Routledge Handbook of Greek Mythology: Based on H.J. Rose's "Handbook of Greek Mythology", Psychology Press, 2004, . Google Books.
 Hesiod, Theogony from The Homeric Hymns and Homerica with an English Translation by Hugh G. Evelyn-White, Cambridge, MA.,Harvard University Press; London, William Heinemann Ltd. 1914. Online version at the Perseus Digital Library. Greek text available from the same website.
 Keightley, Thomas, The Mythology of Ancient Greece and Italy, second edition considerably enlarged and improved, London, Whittaker and Co., 1838.
 Leeming, David, "Metis". In The Oxford Companion to World Mythology, Oxford University Press, York University, 2004.
 Morford, Mark P. O., Robert J. Lenardon, Classical Mythology, Eighth Edition, Oxford University Press, 2007. .
 Plato, (1989) The Symposium. Indianapolis, IN: Hackett Publishing Company.
 Smith, William, Dictionary of Greek and Roman Biography and Mythology, London (1873). Online version at the Perseus Digital Library.
 Tripp, Edward, Crowell's Handbook of Classical Mythology, Thomas Y. Crowell Co; First edition (June 1970). .

External links 

 METIS from The Theoi Project
 METIS from greekmythology.com

Greek goddesses
Oceanids
Wisdom goddesses
Crafts goddesses
Divine women of Zeus
Mercurian deities
Mother goddesses
Personifications in Greek mythology
Mythological rape victims
Shapeshifters in Greek mythology
Deeds of Zeus
Athena
Mothers of the twelve Olympians